Calvary United Methodist Church is located at 801 48th Street, on the southeast corner of 48th Street & Baltimore Avenue, in Philadelphia, Pennsylvania. The church was founded in 1896 as Calvary Methodist Episcopal and the current structure was completed in 1906.

Calvary United Methodist Church rents space in its building to a number of churches and community groups. The church also is home to "Calvary Center for Culture and Community" (CCCC), an affiliated non-profit organization that raises funds for building restoration and facilitates use by community groups.

Calvary UMC is a member of the Reconciling Ministries Network, a movement within the United Methodist Church to formally and intentionally welcome LGBT persons to full inclusion in the life of the church. The congregation made this declaration in 1985, shortly after the network's formation.

References

External links
Calvary UMC Official Site

Map

Churches in Philadelphia
United Methodist churches in Pennsylvania
University City, Philadelphia
Akron Plan church buildings